"So Far Away" is a song by American band Stabbing Westward. The song was released as the only single from the band's 2001 eponymous album.

Track listing

Personnel
 Christopher Hall – vocals, guitar
 Derrek Hawkins – guitar
 Jim Sellers – bass
 Walter Flakus – keyboard
 Andy Kubiszewski – drums

Charts

References

2001 singles
Stabbing Westward songs
2001 songs
Songs written by Andy Kubiszewski
Songs written by Christopher Hall (musician)
MNRK Music Group singles